Twilight Time may refer to:

 Twilight, the time between dawn and sunrise or between sunset and dusk
 "Twilight Time" (1944 song), a popular song, best known in the 1958 version by the Platters
 "Twilight Time" (The Moody Blues song), 1967
 Twilight Time (album), a 1993 album by Stratovarius, or the title song
 Twilight Time, an album by André Gagnon
 Twilight Time (home video label), a specialty DVD and Blu-ray label releasing limited editions of classic and vintage films
"Twilight Time" (My Little Pony: Friendship Is Magic episode), a season 4 episode
 Twilight Time (film), a 1982 drama film